Harald Zwart (born 1 July 1965) is a Dutch-Norwegian film director.

Life and career
Although born in the Netherlands, Zwart was raised in Fredrikstad, Norway. By age eight, he had started making short films. He attended the Dutch Film Academy in Amsterdam where he received great acclaim for his student film Gabriel's Surprise. The film was later televised. In addition to several award-winning short films, music videos and commercials, he directed the films Agent Cody Banks, One Night at McCool's, Hamilton and Lange Flate Ballær 2.

He is also the co-director and producer of the first Long Flat Balls, a Norwegian film about soccer fans from the city of Fredrikstad, Norway. This movie, often described as "The Full Monty" with more laughs, became a huge hit in Norway. His highest-grossing film to date is The Karate Kid. He also directed music videos for the Norwegian band a-ha, for the songs "Velvet" and "Forever Not Yours". He also directed the music video for a-ha vocalist Morten Harket's solo release song "Brother".

He is attached to direct Sony Pictures Animation's live-action/CG feature film based on the video game series RollerCoaster Tycoon, and as a director to Universal Pictures' Bakugan, a feature film based on the strategic game and anime series Bakugan Battle Brawlers.

Filmography
Hamilton (1998)
One Night at McCool's (2001)
Agent Cody Banks (2003)
Lange flate ballær (2006)
Lange flate ballær 2 (2008)
The Pink Panther 2 (2009)
Dead Snow (2009, producer)
The Karate Kid (2010)
The Mortal Instruments: City of Bones (2013)
The 12th Man (2017)
Oljefondet (The Oil Fund) (2018, 9-episode TV series)
Lange flate ballær 3 (2022)

Music videos
 A-ha: Velvet (Savoy song) (2000)
 A-ha: Forever Not Yours (2002) 
 Morten Harket Brother (2014)

References

External links

1965 births
Living people
Dutch film directors
Norwegian film directors
People from Fredrikstad
Dutch people of Norwegian descent